Lidao is a town in Rongcheng City, Weihai, in eastern Shandong province, China. , it administers Yingbo Residential Community and the following 71 villages:
Lidao Village
Yingxizhuang Village
Xiaojiang Village
Guanjia Village
Zhuangshangsongjia Village
Dadingshan Village
Wolongwangjia Village
Zhongwodao Village
Beiwodao Village
Jinjiaogang Village
Boxiya Village
Nanzhengjia Village
Xiangjiazhai Village
Chenfengzhuang Village
Chujiabo Village
Shanhouwangjia Village
Qiaozigou Village
Gouchenjia Village
Guanshentun Village
Zhangjiatun Village
Yangjiashan Village
Dongzhuang Village
Dasujia Village
Datuanlijia Village
Xiaotuanlijia Village
Liujiaquan Village
Nanhuayuan Village
Beihuayuan Village
Liangshuiquan Village
Gongjiashan Village
Datuanlinjia Village
Xiaotuanlinjia Village
Qujiatai Village
Ximiaoyuan Village
Dongmiaoyuan Village
Guligaojia Village
Xiangshanqian Village
Jinjiaokou Village
Baiyundong Village
Qianshentangkou Village
Houshentangkou Village
Donggu Village
Xingbeitai Village
Xingnantai Village
Xingshipengzi Village
Xiaobo Village
Xingchenjia Village
Xingxiaoqiao Village
Guojia Village
Yanbo Village
Beimadaohe Village
Cang'erya Village
Donglin Village
Xilin Village
Wangjiashan Village
Shishandong Village
Xilichabu Village
Donglichabu Village
Fenghuangya Village
Nanmadaohe Village
Dongyandun Village
Houtuan Village
Gouyazhangjia Village
Eshishan Village
Dazhuangxujia Village
Wawushi Village
Nanwodao Village
Donggaojia Village
Caodaozhai Village
Yanjia Village
Yandunjiao Village

References

Township-level divisions of Shandong
Rongcheng, Shandong